Geyserite, or siliceous sinter, is a form of opaline silica that is often found as crusts or layers around hot springs and geysers. Botryoidal geyserite is known as fiorite. Geyserite is porous due to the silica enclosing many small cavities. Siliceous sinter should not be confused with calcareous sinter, which is made of calcium carbonate.

In May 2017, evidence of the earliest known life on land may have been found in 3.48-billion-year-old geyserite uncovered in the Pilbara Craton of Western Australia.

See also

 
 
 
 Timeline of the evolutionary history of life

References

External links

Mindat with location data

Geysers
Opals
Sedimentary rocks